Delovce is a settlement in the Suva Reka municipality in the disputed region of Kosovo. It lies 1097 m above sea level. It is inhabited by ethnic Serbs and Albanians; in the 1991 census, it had 591 inhabitants.

Notes

References

Villages in Suva Reka
Serbian enclaves in Kosovo